Tsarevna Catherine Alekseyevna (27 November 1658 - 1 May 1718) was the fifth daughter of Tsar Alexis of Russia and Maria Miloslavskaya, sister of Tsar Feodor III of Russia and Tsar Ivan V of Russia and half-sister of Tsar Peter the Great.
 
Catherine was named after Saint Catherine of Alexandria. In accordance with the Muscovite custom for imperial princesses, she lived in seclusion and never married. During the Moscow uprising of 1682, however, Ivan Andreyevich Khovansky (Tararui) is alleged to have planned to marry Catherine to his son Andrey Ivanovich Khovanskii in order to place him on the throne. Catherine Alekseyevna seems to have been supportive of Westernized reforms of Russia; while Russian princesses were expected to live in seclusion and screen completely from being seen by men, she was evidently seen in public in 1683, as a witness from that year reported how she did not wear the traditional clothes, but dressed in Polish costume and did not wear her hair in traditional braids.

In 1698, Catherine was interrogated for potential involvement in the Streltsy Uprising on the tsar Peter the Great, but released after it had been established that she had nothing to do with it. According to contemporaries, she was the only one of the half-sisters of tsar Peter the Great never to have angered him, because she never involved herself in politics. She participated in the Orthodox baptism of Catherine I of Russia.

In 1716, however, she was briefly suspected by the tsar of being involved in a conspiracy because of her nightly walks with her steward Bogdanov, who was exiled to Siberia.

References

Борис Антонов. Русские цари. Издательство «П-2», Санкт-Петербург, 2008

1658 births
1718 deaths
Russian tsarevnas
House of Romanov
Royalty from Moscow
17th-century Russian people
18th-century people from the Russian Empire
17th-century Russian women
18th-century women from the Russian Empire
Children of Alexis of Russia